is a professional Japanese baseball pitcher for the Yokohama DeNA BayStars of Nippon Professional Baseball.

External links

 NPB.com

1993 births
Living people
Baseball people from Hiroshima Prefecture
Hosei University alumni
Japanese baseball players
Nippon Professional Baseball pitchers
Yokohama DeNA BayStars players